Benjamin Moore may refer to:

Benjamin Moore (bishop) (1748–1816), Episcopal bishop of New York
Benjamin Moore (biochemist) (1867–1922), British biochemist
Benjamin D. Moore, killed in the Battle of San Pasqual on December 6, 1846
Benjamin E. Moore, New York assemblyman 1914
Benjamin Moore & Co., also known as Benjamin Moore Paints

See also

Ben Moore (disambiguation)
Ben Moor (disambiguation)
Ben More (disambiguation)

Moore, Benjamin